Themistoklis Athanasios "Themis" Patrinos (born 18 January 2001) is a Greek professional footballer who plays as a forward for Super League 2 club Egaleo.

Career statistics

Club

References

2001 births
Living people
Greece youth international footballers
Super League Greece 2 players
Ergotelis F.C. players
Association football forwards
Footballers from Athens
Greek footballers